Margav-e Olya (also Romanized as Margāv-e ‘Olyā; also known as Margāb-e ‘Olyā and Margāb ‘Olyā) is a village in Farim Rural District, Dodangeh District, Sari County, Mazandaran Province, Iran. At the 2006 census, its population was 150, in 50 families.

References 

Populated places in Sari County